In Aymara mythology, Anchanchu or Janchanchu (hispanized spelling Anchancho) is a terrible demon which haunts caves, rivers, and other isolated places. This deity is closely related to the Uru god Tiw.

See also 
 Abchanchu
 Muki

References

Aymara legendary creatures